Oriens concinna, the Tamil dartlet, is a skipper butterfly belonging to the family Hesperiidae. It is a rare find in India and Australia. In India, it is found in Kerala, Tamil Nadu and Karnataka.

Description

References

Entomologist, Volumes 67–68. West, Newman & Company, 1934 Oriens-concinna 

Bombay Natural History Society, 1957 - Butterflies - 523 pages
Butterflies of India, by Arun Pratap Singh (Ph. D.)
ifoundbutterflies.org Oriens concinna

Taractrocerini
Butterflies of Asia
Butterflies described in 1897